FLUKE Mini-Comics & Zine Festival is an annual comic festival in Athens, Georgia, United States, focusing on alternative comics, minicomics, zines, underground comics, and graphic arts. Initially held in January, the event has been set in March or April since 2006. FLUKE aims to maintain a smaller environment than other, larger comic conventions. Initially held at the now-defunct bar Tasty World, the festival has taken place at Athens' 40 Watt Club since 2011. It has been considered a premier destination for alternative comics in the Southeastern United States.

History
Fluke was established in January 2002 by cartoonist T. Edward Bak. He founded the festival after the previous year's Small Press Expo was cancelled in the wake of the September 11 attacks. The name of the festival comes from the fact that its genesis was by chance, or a fluke. For its second year, Bak asked for help organizing the event from cartoonist Patrick Dean and 'zine publisher Robert Newsome, who ended up absorbing the festival from him and serving as its organizers in the years since. 
The mission statement for the festival states:

Co-organizer Newsome has described Fluke as a "glorified zine swap". For much of its first decade, FLUKE was held upstairs in Tasty World, a local bar and music venue. Since 2011, it has been held at the 40 Watt Club. It took place in January each year initially until an ice storm struck the day of the show, after which it was moved to March–April. The 40 Watt keeps an open bar during the event, and some years have featured complimentary cake for exhibitors. In addition to up-and-coming creators, FLUKE often features appearances from local established artists such as Joey Weiser, Eleanor Davis, and Drew Weing.

In recent years, the show has been sponsored by Bizarro-Wuxtry, Flagpole Magazine, Inch High Button Guy, Top Shelf Productions and the Sequential Artists Workshop.

The 2020 event, originally scheduled for March 28, was later rescheduled to September 5, and then cancelled altogether due to the COVID-19 pandemic.

Event dates and locations

 January 19, 2002: Tasty World
 January 11, 2003: Tasty World
 January 31, 2004: Tasty World
 January 29, 2005: Tasty World
 April 1, 2006: Tasty World
 April 7, 2007: Tasty World
 April 12, 2008: Tasty World
 April 4, 2009: Tasty World
 April 17, 2010: Ciné
 April 23, 2011: 40 Watt
 April 21, 2012: 40 Watt
 April 6, 2013: 40 Watt
 April 19, 2014: 40 Watt
 April 11, 2015: 40 Watt
 April 23, 2016: 40 Watt
 April 29, 2017: 40 Watt
 March 24, 2018: 40 Watt
 March 30, 2019: 40 Watt
 March 28, 2020: 40 Watt — rescheduled and then cancelled due to COVID-19 pandemic
 March 26, 2022: 40 Watt
 March 25, 2023: 40 Watt

See also 
 STAPLE!

References

External links
 

Comics conventions in the United States
Recurring events established in 2002
Conventions in Georgia (U.S. state)
Book fairs in the United States
March events
Athens, Georgia
Annual events in Georgia (U.S. state)
2002 establishments in Georgia (U.S. state)
Festivals established in 2002
Comics conventions